Lady Day Swings is a compilation album by jazz singer Billie Holiday (also known as Lady Day). It was released in 2002 by Sony Music's Legacy Recordings and presents a collection of 16 songs drawn from the Lady Day: The Complete Billie Holiday on Columbia 1933–1944 box set released by Legacy Recordings in 2001.

Background 
Focusing on Holiday's recordings with swing bands between 1935 and 1941 in New York, the album gives an insight into Holiday's earlier, swing-style work. The album features renditions of songs by well-known composers and songwriters, such as Cole Porter or Irving Berlin. The songs were originally recorded under Brunswick Records, Vocalion Records and Okeh Records, all secondary labels of Columbia Records. In 1933, at the age of 17, Holiday met John Hammond, who was a producer and journalist working for Columbia Records at the time. He introduced her to jazz musicians such as Benny Goodman or jazz pianist Teddy Wilson and his band, whom she collaborated with for many of her early recordings and several of those included in this compilation. Her collaboration with big bands at the time differed from her later music, but already reflected her own distinct style. In an essay published in 1962, Music critic Ralph J. Gleason even argues that recordings from these early years feature a joy to her voice that declined in her later years. Her work during these years introduced her to record labels and laid the groundwork for her fame.

Track listing

References 

Billie Holiday albums
2002 compilation albums